Orangeburg, also known as The Garden City, is the principal city in and the county seat of Orangeburg County, South Carolina, United States. The population of the city was 13,964 according to the 2010 United States Census and declined to 12,704 in the 2020 census. The city is located 37 miles southeast of Columbia, on the north fork of the Edisto River.

Two historically black institutions of higher education are located in Orangeburg: Claflin University (a liberal arts college) and South Carolina State University (a public university).

History

18th century
European settlement in this area started in 1704 when George Sterling set up a post here for fur trade with Native Americans. To encourage settlement, the General Assembly of the Province of South Carolina in 1730 organized the area as a township, naming it Orangeburg for William IV, Prince of Orange, the son-in-law of King George II of Great Britain. In 1735, a colony of 200 Swiss, German and Dutch immigrants formed a community near the banks of the North Edisto River. The site was attractive because of the fertile soil and the abundance of wildlife. The river provided the all-important transportation waterway to the port of Charleston on the Atlantic coast for the area's agriculture and lumber products, and for shipping goods upriver. The town soon became a well-established and successful colony, composed chiefly of small yeomen farmers.

Orangeburg's first church was established by a German Lutheran congregation. It later identified as an Anglican Church, which was the established church and exempt from colonial taxation. The church building was erected prior to 1763 in the center of the village; it was destroyed by fighting during the Revolutionary War. A new church was built; during the Civil War, it was used as a smallpox hospital by General William Tecumseh Sherman on his march through with Union forces.

19th century
After the American Revolution, the character of the county changed dramatically. Invention by Eli Whitney of a mass-produced cotton gin for processing short-staple or "green seed" cotton made this type of cotton profitable. It was easily grown in the upland areas, and the county was rapidly developed into large cotton plantations. Agricultural labor was provided by enslaved African Americans, many brought into the area in a forced migration from the coastal areas or the Upper South via the domestic slave trade. Slaves became the majority of population in the county and city. Freed after the Civil War, blacks began to gain educations, and two colleges were established in the city, the second designated as a land grant institution for all black students in the state under segregation. Blacks were also subject to Jim Crow laws passed by the Democrat-dominated state legislature; they were deprived of their ability to vote by South Carolina's disenfranchising constitution passed at the turn of the 20th century, which erected barriers to voter registration. In 1919 The Orangeburg Regional Medical Center opened. This area is also known for its extremely rich soil.

20th century

Efforts by blacks to regain civil rights increased in the postwar period after World War II. In the 1960s, Orangeburg was a major center of Civil Rights Movement activities by students from both Claflin College and South Carolina State College as well as black residents of the city. After the US Supreme Court ruling in Brown v. Board of Education (1954) declaring segregation in public schools to be unconstitutional, local blacks sought integration of local schools in 1956. Whites retaliated economically, sometimes firing activists or evicting them from rental housing.  College students came to their support with hunger strikes, boycotts, and mass marches. In 1960, over 400 students were arrested on sit-ins and integration marches organized by the Congress of Racial Equality (CORE).

In August 1963, the Orangeburg Freedom Movement (OFM), chaired by Dr. Harlowe Caldwell of the NAACP, submitted 10 pro-integration demands to the Orangeburg Mayor and City Council. After negotiations failed, mass demonstrations similar to those in the Birmingham campaign in Alabama resulted in more than 1,300 arrests. Local efforts to end segregation in public places continued, particularly after Congress passed the Civil Rights Act of 1964.  On February 8, 1968, after days of protests against a segregated bowling alley, violence broke out near the bowling alley as police attacked Black students from South Carolina State. Police opened fire on a crowd of students, killing Samuel Hammond, Henry Smith, and Delano Middleton, and wounding 27 others in what became known as the "Orangeburg massacre".

21st century
In May 2000, the city created the Orangeburg County Community of Character initiative.  It is a collaborative effort in community development by the Downtown Orangeburg Revitalization Association (DORA), The Times and Democrat newspaper, the Orangeburg County Chamber of Commerce, and the Orangeburg County Development Commission.  In 2005, the National Civic League awarded Orangeburg County the All-America City Award which recognizes and encourages civic excellence.  It honors communities in which citizens, government, businesses, and non-profit organizations demonstrate successful resolution of critical community issues.

In 2007, Orangeburg hosted the first Democratic U.S. presidential candidate debate of the campaign season at Martin Luther King Jr. Auditorium on the campus of South Carolina State University; future president Barack Obama, was one of the debaters.

Geography
According to the United States Census Bureau, the city has a total area of 8.3 square miles (21.5 km2), of which 8.3 square miles (21.5 km2) is land and 0.12% is water.

Climate
The climate in this area is characterized by relatively high temperatures and evenly distributed precipitation throughout the year.  According to the Köppen Climate Classification system, Orangeburg has a humid subtropical climate, abbreviated Cfa on climate maps.

Demographics

2020 census

As of the 2020 United States census, there were 13,240 people, 4,455 households, and 2,283 families residing in the city.

2010 census
As of the census of 2010, there were 13,964 people, 4,512 households, and 2,526 families residing in the city. The population density was 1648.8 There were 5,168 housing units at an average density of 623.1 per square mile (240.7/km2). The racial makeup of the city was 75.04% African American, 19.2% White, 0.18% Native American, 1.74% Asian, 0.05% Pacific Islander, 0.79% from other races, and 1.1% from two or more races. Hispanic or Latino of any race were 1.9% of the population.

There were 4,421 households, out of which 18.9% had children under the age of 18 living with them, 33.5% were married couples living together, 18.8% had a female householder with no husband present, and 44.0% were non-families. 35.2% of all households were made up of individuals, and 13.1% had someone living alone who was 65 years of age or older. The average household size was 2.23 and the average family size was 2.88.

In the city, the population was spread out, with 17.7% under the age of 18, 28.6% from 18 to 24, 21.0% from 25 to 44, 17.5% from 45 to 64, and 15.2% who were 65 years of age or older. The median age was 28 years. For every 100 females, there were 76.2 males. For every 100 females age 18 and over, there were 71.0 males.

The median income for a household in the city was $30,306, and the median income for a family was $37,008. Males had a median income of $30,310 versus $21,935 for females. The per capita income for the city was $15,263. About 17.9% of families and 24.7% of the population were below the poverty line, including 34.7% of those under age 18 and 14.8% of those age 65 or over.

Government and crime

Government
The city operates under the council-manager form of government. The governing body is composed of a mayor and six members. The mayor is determined through a nonpartisan, at-large election for a four-year term of office while Council Members are chosen through nonpartisan, single-member district (SMD) elections. Council members are elected to staggered four-year terms of office.

The City council is a legislative body, establishing policies with recommendations from the professional city administrator, who is hired by the council. The city administrator acts as the chief administrator of the council's policies implemented through the administrative control of city departments given to him by ordinance.

Mayor
Michael C. Butler

Council Members 
Richard F. Stroman
Charles W. Jernigan
Charles B. Barnwell, Jr.
Bernard Haire
L. Zimmerman Keitt (Mayor Pro Tem)
Sandra P. Knotts

State Senators
Brad Hutto
John Matthews

Crime
The following table shows Orangeburg's crime rate in 6 crimes that Morgan Quitno uses in its calculations for "America's most dangerous cities" rankings, in comparison to 10,000 people. The statistics provided are not for the actual number of crimes committed, but for the number of crimes committed per capita.

Education

Colleges and universities

 Claflin University, founded in 1869, is the oldest historically black university in the state of South Carolina. In 2014 it was ranked by Washington Monthly as the top liberal arts college in the state and the top HBCU in the country.
 South Carolina State University is 4-year public historically Black institution in Orangeburg, founded in 1896.
 Orangeburg–Calhoun Technical College is a member of the American Association of Community Colleges and is accredited by the Commission on Colleges of the Southern Association of Colleges and Schools (SACS) to award associate degrees.

Public schools
 Orangeburg Consolidated School District Three
 Consolidated School District Four
 Orangeburg Consolidated School District Five
 Orangeburg-Wilkinson Senior High School

Charter schools
 OCSD5 High School for Health Professions
Felton Laboratory Charter School

Private schools
 Orangeburg Preparatory Schools, Inc.
 Orangeburg Christian Academy

Library
Orangeburg has a public library, a branch of the Orangeburg County Library.

Media 
The Times and Democrat serves as the daily newspaper for the Orangeburg area.

Transportation

Terminals
 Orangeburg Municipal Airport
 Greyhound
 Southeastern Stages

Highways 
 U.S. Route 301 
 U.S. Route 601
 U.S. Route 21
 U.S. Route 178
 South Carolina Highway 4
 South Carolina Highway 33

Events and attractions

Garden
The Edisto Memorial Gardens displays past and current award-winning roses from the All-American Rose Selections. Some 4,000 plants representing at least 75 labeled varieties of roses are always on display in the Gardens. A playground was added in 1922, and a greenhouse and nursery facility in 1947. To extend the season of beauty, the first rose garden was planted in 1951.

Museum
The IP Stanback Museum & Planetarium, named for the first African-American chairman of the university's board of trustees, Israel Pinkney Stanback, had its origin in the basement of the then South Carolina State College's library in the early 1970s. The Museum and Planetarium is located on the campus of South Carolina State University and signifies their commitment to community service. The Museum's exhibition area is one of the largest in the state. Its forty-foot planetarium dome, located across the foyer adjacent to the galleries, has an auditorium capacity of eighty-two seats and a Minolta IIB Planetarium Projector. The building is easily accessible to the handicapped and is a uniquely adaptable facility, capable of hosting many different types of presentations.

Festivals
The Orangeburg Festival of Roses began as a vision held by a group of citizens seeking a way to enhance the development of Orangeburg and improve the quality of life for its residents. As a result of that vision, the first festival was held in 1972. The Greater Orangeburg Chamber of Commerce was the sole sponsor of that first festival. At present the City of Orangeburg and the Orangeburg County Chamber of Commerce are co-sponsors of the event. The festival includes such events as a river race, a basscatcher tournament, the Princess of Roses pageant, and various sports tournaments.

During the winter in Orangeburg, more festivities get under way when raccoon hunters from throughout the Southeast gather for the Grand American Coon Hunt. Also on the "Top Twenty" list, the hunt, which takes place each year in early January, in the largest field trial for coon dogs in the United States and is a qualifying event for the World Coon Hunt. Thousands of people come to the fairgrounds to see the dogs, exhibits and the sights and sounds of this one of a kind event.'Landmarks
The following notable buildings and districts are listed on the National Register of Historic Places.

Alan Mack Site (38OR67)
All-Star Triangle Bowl
Amelia Street Historic District
Claflin College Historic District
Dixie Library Building
Donald Bruce House
Dukes Gymnasium
East Russell Street Area Historic District
Ellis Avenue Historic District
Enterprise Cotton Mills Building
F.H.W. Briggman House
Great Branch Teacherage
Hodge Hall
Hotel Eutaw
Lowman Hall, South Carolina State College
Maj. John Hammond Fordham House
Mt. Pisgah Baptist Church
Orangeburg City Cemetery
Orangeburg County Fair Main Exhibit Building
Orangeburg County Jail
Orangeburg Downtown Historic District
South Carolina State College Historic District
William P. Stroman House
Tingley Memorial Hall, Claflin College
Treadwell Street Historic District
Trinity Methodist Episcopal Church
White House United Methodist Church
Whitman Street Area Historic District
Williams Chapel A.M.E. Church 

Notable people
 Donnie Abraham: football player for East Tennessee State University, Tampa Bay Buccaneers, New York Jets.
 Thomas G. Andrews: attorney and Associate Justice of the Oklahoma Supreme Court was born in Orangeburg in 1882.
 Alex Barron: Florida State tackle, drafted by the St. Louis Rams 19th overall in the 2005 NFL Draft.
 Shelton Benjamin: professional wrestler and former amateur wrestler currently signed to World Wrestling Entertainment, born in Orangeburg on July 9, 1975.
 Gloria Blackwell: educator and civil rights activist.
 Choo-Choo Coleman: former baseball catcher for the New York Mets and Philadelphia Phillies.
 Monique Coleman: actress and singer, most notably from High School Musical, High School Musical 3: Senior Year and High School Musical 2.
 Angell Conwell: actress, born in Orangeburg, SC on August 2, 1983.
 Bob Corker: U.S. senator from Tennessee, born in Orangeburg on August 24, 1952.
 Don Covay: musician, born in Orangeburg on March 24, 1938.
 Manish Dayal: actor, born in Orangeburg on June 17, 1983.
 Ralph B. Everett: President and CEO of the Washington, D.C.-based Joint Center for Political and Economic Studies, born in Orangeburg, SC on June 23, 1951.
 Abby Fisher: one of the first African-American cookbook authors, born as a slave in Orangeburg in June, 1831. 
 Michael Hackett (born 1960): basketball player, Liga Profesional de Baloncesto MVP in 1984, and Israeli League Top Scorer in 1991
 Jaime Harrison: politician, born in Orangeburg on February 5, 1976.
 Deveron Harper: NFL player
 Dwayne Harper: professional football cornerback who played 12 seasons in the National Football League.
 Israel Hicks (1943–2010): stage director who presented August Wilson's entire 10-play Pittsburgh Cycle.
 Corinne Stocker Horton (1871–1947), elocutionist and journalist
 Tim Jennings: University of Georgia cornerback, drafted by the Indianapolis Colts in the 2nd round of the 2006 NFL Draft.
 Brice Johnson: basketball star at University of North Carolina. First-Team All-American at UNC and led the Tar Heels to the National Championship game. 1st Round NBA draft pick of the Los Angeles Clippers. 
 Maurice Kelly: NFL and CFL player
 Mikki Moore: professional basketball player who has played for 9 teams.
 Benjamin F. Payton (1932-2016), President of Tuskegee University (1981 to 2010).
 Walter Merritt Riggs, engineering professor, first football coach at Clemson University, President of Clemson University, 1910–1924, born in Orangeburg on January 24, 1873.
 Curtis C. Robinson (August 25, 1919 ~ October 12, 2009), former U.S. Army Air Force officer, pharmacist, and combat fighter pilot/jet pilot with the prodigious Tuskegee Airmen Legacy - The Washington Post. "CURTIS C. "CC" ROBINSON." https://www.legacy.com/us/obituaries/washingtonpost/name/curtis-robinson-obituary?pid=172778397 
 Eugene Robinson: op-ed columnist, The Washington Post, born in Orangeburg in 1955.
 Rusty Russell: football player for the Philadelphia Eagles, Orlando Predators, Charlotte Rage and Florida Bobcats.
 Mike Sharperson (1961-1996): Major League Baseball player for Los Angeles Dodgers, Toronto Blue Jays and Atlanta Braves, member of 1988 World Series championship team; born in Orangeburg on Oct. 4, 1961.
 Shawnee Smith: actress and musician, well known for her roles as Amanda Young in Saw I-VI and Linda in the TV series Becker''; also half of the country-rock band Smith & Pyle alongside actress Missi Pyle; born in Orangeburg, SC on July 3, 1970.
 Steve Sonic: musician, founder of seminal punk band Red Menace and member of punk band Bored Suburban Youth.
 Bill Spiers: Major League Baseball player for Milwaukee Brewers, New York Mets, and Houston Astros.
 Archie Spigner: New York City Council member; born in Orangeburg, SC
 Cecil Williams: photographer, civil rights activist, author and inventor; born in Orangeburg in 1937
 Johnny Williams: jazz musician with the Count Basie Orchestra for 40 years
 Karen J. Williams:  Chief Judge of the United States Court of Appeals for the Fourth Circuit, born in Orangeburg in 1951.
 Herm Winningham: Major League Baseball player and World Series champion (1990).

References

Further reading 
 a b c "Census QuickFacts". United States Census Bureau. Census.gov. Retrieved 2012-01-22.

External links

 City website
 The Orangeburg Regional Medical Center

Cities in South Carolina
Cities in Orangeburg County, South Carolina
County seats in South Carolina